Thomas Whiteside may refer to:

 Thomas Whiteside (bishop) (1857–1921), English prelate of the Roman Catholic Church
 Thomas Whiteside (journalist) (1918–1997), American journalist
 Tom Whiteside (1932–2008), historian of mathematics

See also
 Thomas Whitesides (1836–1919), Australian cricketer